Col Theuns Coetzee  was a South African Army officer from the artillery who was a war hero.

Military career 

He joined the South African Defence Force in 1976 as a conscript and qualified as a military parachutist. Battery Commander of 141 Battery at 14 Field Regiment. He saw action in Angola during the South African Border War where he earned an Honoris Crux for actions of bravery and being wounded in operations deep inside Angola during 1985. Chief Instructor Gunnery at the School of Artillery from 1988-1990. He passed the Army College course in 1991. 2IC School of Artillery and OC School of Artillery in 1995-1998. He resigned from SANDF in 1998.

Honours and awards

Medals

Proficiency badges

References 

South African military officers
Living people
Year of birth missing (living people)